Loogootee is a city in Perry Township, Martin County, in the U.S. state of Indiana. The population was 2,751 at the time of the 2010 census.

History
Loogootee was established in 1853 when it was certain that a new railroad line would be extended to that point. The post office at Loogootee has been in operation since 1857.

Etymology
Several etymologies of the place name have been proposed. One would make it an Anglicization of the French name Le Gaultier. However, the most likely explanation is that Loogootee is a compound word honoring both Thomas Lowe, engineer of the first train through the town; and Thomas Nesbe Gootee (1797–1870), owner of the land where the town was built.

Climate and geography

Geography

The city is located in the 8th District of Indiana (map) and served by U.S. Representative Larry Bucshon.

Climate
Loogootee has a humid continental climate (Köppen climate classification Dfa) Summers are hot and humid, winters are cool to cold. On average, the warmest month is July. The average coolest month is January. The maximum average precipitation occurs in May.

Demographics

2017 census
As of the census of 2017, there were 2,714 people, 1,206 households, and 709 families living in the city. The racial makeup of the city is 98% White, .8% Hispanic, .6% Two or More Races, .3% Asian, .2% American Indian, .1% Black.

There were 1,206 households, of which 28.6% had children under the age of 18 living with them, 42.4% were married couples living together, 11.9% had a female householder with no husband present, 4.6% had a male householder with no wife present, and 41.2% were non-families. 37.1% of all households were made up of individuals, and 14.7% had someone living alone who was 65 years of age or older. The average household size was 2.25 and the average family size was 2.95.

The median age in the city was 40.4 years. 23.4% of residents were under the age of 18; 8.1% were between the ages of 18 and 24; 23.4% were from 25 to 44; 28.1% were from 45 to 64; and 17.1% were 65 years of age or older. The gender makeup of the city was 47.7% male and 52.3% female.

2000 census
As of the census of 2000, there were 2,741 people, 1,226 households, and 712 families living in the city. The racial makeup of the city was 99.05% White, 0.04% African American, 0.11% Native American, 0.33% Asian, 0.04% from other races, and 0.44% from two or more races. Hispanic or Latino of any race were 0.40% of the population.

There were 1,226 households, out of which 67.3% had children under the age of 18 living with them, 83.4% were married couples living together, 5.8% had a female householder with no husband present, and 11.9% were non-families. 10.0% of all households were made up of individuals, and 7.1% had someone living alone who was 65 years of age or older. The average household size was 3.20 and the average family size was 4.04.

In the city, the population was spread out, with 35.7% under the age of 18, 4.5% from 18 to 24, 22.6% from 25 to 44, 20.5% from 45 to 64, and 14.7% who were 65 years of age or older. The median age was 41 years. For every 100 females, there were 92.8 males. For every 100 females age 18 and over, there were 87.8 males.

The median income for a household in the city was $30,492, and the median income for a family was $37,625. Males had a median income of $30,660 versus $21,490 for females. The per capita income for the city was $17,321. About 13.1% of families and 16.4% of the population were below the poverty line, including 23.2% of those under age 18 and 10.7% of those age 65 or over.

Education and sports

Loogootee has three schools in its district: Loogootee Elementary (PreK-4), Loogootee Middle School (5-8), and Loogootee High School (9-12). The mascot is a lion. The school colors are black and old gold. The school song is "Washington and Lee Swing". Loogootee has a long-standing, proud tradition of high school basketball. It is the home of the winningest high school basketball coach in state history, Jack Butcher, who had a career record of 806-250 (all at Loogootee High School). Butcher led Loogootee basketball to two state finals appearances under the single-class state tournament (1970 & 1975). Loogootee's latest boys' basketball sectional title was in 2012, which began a run that ended with Loogootee High School's first state championship in any sport. Loogootee boasts rivalries with area schools, North Daviess and Barr-Reeve. The Lions own the all-time series against both schools, and the rivalry with Barr-Reeve has recently been considered the state's best high school rivalry by several media outlets. The boys' basketball program has had an impressive winning record for many years. In the past fifty years, only three seasons have finished with below .500 records. Loogootee's boys' tennis program has also gained notoriety after winning twelve straight sectional titles under the guidance of Coach Rick Graves. Additionally, the girls' tennis program won seven consecutive sectional titles from 2004-2010 under coach Mike Tippery. The volleyball team was state runner-up for three consecutive years (2005–2007)and also in 2012.

The town has a lending library, the Loogootee Public Library. The library is part of the Evergreen Indiana Library Consortium  and the eIndiana Digital Consortium, which allow members to obtain books and eBooks from any member library.

Notable people
Nathan Kimball, brevet major general in the Union Army during the American Civil War.
Ann Joseph Morris, beekeeper
L. Brooks Patterson, county executive of Oakland County, Michigan.
Carolyn Sherif, a social psychologist.
Patrick Summers, a conductor and Artistic and Music Director of the Houston Grand Opera

Economy
A large number of the residents of Loogootee are employed with the federal government and government contractors at Naval Surface Warfare Center Crane Division.

Transportation
Loogootee is the point of intersection of two major US highways, U.S. Route 231 and U.S. Route 50

US Highways
  U.S. Route 231
  U.S. Route 50
  U.S. Route 150

Indiana State Roads (local references)
  State Road 550

References

Cities in Indiana
Communities of Southwestern Indiana
Cities in Martin County, Indiana
1853 establishments in Indiana
Populated places established in 1853